Eugene Lavrenchuk (born 24 June 1982) is a Ukrainian opera and drama director, producer and teacher. Director, co-founder (2002), and artistic director of the "Polish Theatre in Moscow (2002 – 2014)" and the "School of acting and directing". Chief director of the Odesa National Opera House (2018 – 2021). In 2017 was Director of the Euroclub and Stage-director of the Eurovision Song Contest 2017 in Kyiv. Winner of international competitions and festivals in Europe. Makes stagings, but also carries out active teaching activities in Ukraine, Poland, Germany, Lithuania and Israel.

Biography 

Born in 1982 in Lviv, where he graduated from a Polish school. In 2003 he graduated from the Russian Academy of Theatre Arts (Roman Viktyuk’s workshop) as an opera director, later - higher courses of choreography at the   Maria Curie-Sklodowska University (Lublin, Poland), Higher Courses for directors of feature films (Moscow).

Officially registered Independent Nonprofit Organization "Polish Theatre in Moscow under the leadership of Eugene Lavrenchuk" in 2004. The Theatre  was opened with the performance  "Snow", which was Eugene Lavrenchuk's diploma performance. Great opera Diva Elena Obraztsova, who was chairman of the examination board, was present at the play, and  she subsequently signed E.Lavrenchuk's   diploma of  Opera director.

In 2004 he won the Gold Medal, the title of " Hero of the Anniversary of the Year" and "The youngest director of the year" at the exhibition “Stage of  Russia”.

In 2010, Eugene Lavrenchuk International Foundation  was founded in Warsaw.

In 2013, by the  decision of the Minister of Culture of Poland Bogdan Zdrojewski  Eugene Lavrenchuk was awarded the title "For outstanding achievements in the field of culture and science", of Honored Worker of Culture of Poland, Honored Artist of Poland.

Since January 2015 is a lecturer at the Royal Academy of Business and Diplomacy (Wroclaw, Poland) - Królewska Akademia Biznesu i Dyplomacji.

9.08. 2016 The Commission of Israeli Ministry of Culture awarded Eugene Lavrenchuk with the highest title in the field of arts - "Outstanding cultural figure  of Israel" ( "Mitstayen bemeyuhat be Tarbut Israeli")

2017 - Director of the Euroclub and Stage-director of the Eurovision Song Contest in Kyiv.

Since 2018 - Chief Director of the Odesa National Opera and Ballet Theater and General Director of the Odesa National Opera Foundation

2020 - Laureate of the Les Kurbas Prize (for staging the opera "La Traviata").

2020 - Winner of the All-Ukrainian prize-competition "GRA" (Great Real Art) for staging the opera "La Traviata".

For outstanding personal contribution to art in 2021 by order of the President of Ukraine Eugene Lavrenchuk was awarded the title of "Honored Artist of Ukraine".

He is preparing shooting of the film «Ulysses» and the short film "Narcissus" after his own script.

Odesa National Opera House 
Since 2018 - Chief Director of the Odesa National Opera and Ballet Theater and General Director of the Odesa National Opera Foundation.

•	 "The Last Romantic" - Theatrical cycle from the operas of Richard Strauss - Capriccio, Der Rosenkavalier,  Ariadne auf Naxos and Salome

•	 Open-air concert "Opera & Ballet Gala";

•	 "La Traviata" G.Verdi;

•	 Anniversary concert "Opera Stars in Odesa"

2019 - Initiator and co-organized the International Opera Conference "Open to Progress" in Odesa which representatives of European publications, critics and members of the Opera Europe association came.

Polish Theater in Moscow 
In April 2003,   the first premier of the theater   "Snow" after the play by Stanislaw Przybyszewski was  held in the theater "Et Cetera" in Moscow on Novy Arbat.

This was followed by the premieres:

•	“Maria Stuarda”  G.Donizetti / J. Slowacki;

•	"Snow" St. Przybyszewski;

•	"Yvonne, Princess of Burgundy" after the play by W. Gombrowicz;

•	"Romeo and Juliet" by William Shakespeare (producer);

•	"Tango" based on Sl. Mrożek

•	"Decline of Europe" (writer, producer)

•	"Edip Sleep" (producer)

•	"Abduction of Europe" after his own script

Polish Theatre in Moscow is actively contributing to the process of international theater: the theater repeatedly showed their performances at International theater festivals "Theatrical meetings" Rzeszow (Poland), twice - 2003 and 2009, the International Shakespeare Festival in Gdansk, M. Konopnicka International Festival in Przedborz (Poland). Besides, Polish Theatre in Moscow is a regular participant of theater festival in the framework of the program "Moscow - the City of the World".  Theatre performances have been shown on stages not only in Moscow and other large Russian cities, but also   in Vilnius, big cities of Poland - Warsaw, Szczecin, Kraków, Rzeszow, Wroclaw, Sopot, etc.  The theater not only makes plays, but also conducts a variety of educational programs and training for actors  of Moscow theaters and students of theater schools. School of acting and directing -  "Open Theater School of Eugene Lavrenchuk"  - was opened within the theater. Regular training for personal growth,  Polish language courses and theatrical studio for children are also held.

School of acting and directing 
E. Lavrenchuk carries out active pedagogical activities in Russia and Europe. He is the founder and head of the School  of acting and directing - "Open Theater School of Lavrenechuka Eugene." The school education and training program is based on his own method of teaching using the new interpretation of the ideas of Michael Chekhov, Jerzy Grotowski, Antonin Artaud and Konstantin Stanislavsky. The essence of the new method underlying the teaching of acting and directing is antipsychologism as the basis of acting and directorial thinking. This radically changes the basic criteria of acting and elocution. The possibility of an effective alternative to traditional methods of teaching in  theater education is proved by regular screenings, master classes and participated in international festivals. Every year, the School of Eugene Lavrenchuk conducts seasonal outreach workshops in the largest Polish cities (Warsaw, Kraków, Zakopane, Gdansk, Sopot, Wroclaw, Swinoujscie, etc.), Where, along with students from Russia and CIS countries interested students from Poland and other European countries are gathered.

The performances in other theaters 
•	“The Chairs” Eugène Ionesco, M. Zankovetska Lviv Academic Theatre. 2004;

•	"The Dragon" E.Shvarts, Lviv Youth Theatre, 2004;

•	«Cavalleria Rusticana» opera by P.Mascagni, Lviv Academic Opera and Ballet Theatre (premiere did not take place because of the death of Music Director), 2005;

•	"Opera Ball" J.Tuwim, Theatre Studio at the Polish Embassy in the Russian Federation, 2006;

•	"Biloxi Blues" N.Simon, Tomsk Drama Theatre, 2006;

•	"Amazonia" D.Glass, Tomsk Drama Theatre, 2006;

•	"Twilight of the Gods" R.Fedenev, Odessa Academic Russian Drama Theatre, 2007;

•	"Tanahschpiel" Odessa Academic Russian Drama Theatre, 2007;

•	"The Dragon" E.Shvarts (new director's edition) Tomsk Theatre of New spectator, 2008;

•	"Anna Karenina" based on Leo Tolstoy, Tomsk Theatre of New spectator, 2009;

•	"Lizard, Lan, Shaman and Gabriela" based on Charles Milosh (iscenisation by Alvida Bajor), Russian Theatre in Vilnius - a joint project of Terra Humana Foundation (Warsaw) and 5 theater companies from Russia, from Ukraine, Lithuania and Poland, 2009;

•	The night bienalle in Tomsk (author of the idea, performer, producer) Tomsk Theatre of New spectator, 2010;

•	"The Passion According to Beckett. Waiting for Godot "(author of the idea, producer) Tomsk Theatre of New spectator, 2010;

•	"Fathers and Sons: Ordinary Fascism" (author of the idea, producer) Tomsk Theatre of New spectator, 2010;

•	"WORKSHOP" (artistic project leader, Producer) - cyclic project 2007-2015. - Reporting screenings, performances of students' Open Theatre School Eugene Lavrenchuk ", Moscow;

•	"We play Chekhov" Open Theatre School Eugene Lavrenchuk, 2013;

•	"Waiting List" by A.Mardan, Odessa Academic Russian Drama Theatre, 2015;

•	"Judas and his brothers" based on the 1st Book of Maccabees, Theatre Eyhal Tarbut, Netanya (Israel) 2015;

•	"Wonderful cuckold" by F.Krommelink, artistic director of the project, producer (director Olga Menshikova), Odessa Academic Russian Drama Theatre, 2016;

•	"Notes of a Madman" by N. Gogol, artistic director of the project, producer (director Igor Nevedrov), Odessa Academic Russian Drama Theatre, 2016;

•	 "Snowstorm" Marina Tsvetaeva, artistic director of the project, producer (director Rishat Gali), Odessa Academic Russian Drama Theatre, 2016;

•	"Decameron" J. Boccaccio, artistic director of the project, producer (director Vladimir Butakov), Odessa Academic Russian Drama Theatre, 2016.

Arrest in Italy and release 
Lavrenchuk has been arrested in Naples, Italy on December 17, 2021 under a Russian arrest warrant while he was coming back to Kyiv from Tel Aviv. He has been held in custody in the Poggioreale prison in Naples for embezzlement, a crime reportedly committed in the Russian Federation. Lavrenchuk's mother and his closest colleagues have told the media that the Russian authorities may have wanted to arrest him for political reasons. Lavrenchuk’s name was later removed from the most-wanted list, with the global police agency telling Russian and Italian authorities in early January that his inclusion was inconsistent with an article in its statute that forbids “any intervention or activities of a political, military, religious or racial character”. Ukrainian and italian diplomats, politicians, representatives of the cultural elite, intellectuals, city mayors, theater groups, symphony orchestras, the Guild of Directors of Ukraine, PEN Ukraine and PEN A merica came forward with letters of support and petitions demanding Eugene immediate release. Also in the Italian parliament, he raised the issue of the immediate release of Eugene Riccardo Magi. Pope Francis also sent his petition to the Italian prosecutor's office and the Italian Parliament.

Naples’ court of appeal released Lavrenchuk at the request of the Italian justice minister, Marta Cartabia, who said that “in consideration of the dramatic developments concerning Ukraine” Lavrenchuk could be subjected to “treatment contrary to his fundamental rights” if extradited to Russia, owing to the fact that he is Ukrainian and opposed to the Russian president, Vladimir Putin.

A hearing is due to take place on 17 March at which Lavrenchuk is expected to be informed that the extradition attempt has been rejected.

Lavrenchuk, who was held at Poggioreale prison before being transferred to house arrest, is free to leave Italy but wants to stay for the judicial conclusion.

“I’m grateful to Marta Cartabia for asking for my release,” he told the Guardian. “She wrote that I needed to be freed immediately because of the war, because I’m Ukrainian and because I opposed Putin – but I don’t want to speculate on the war, I want to be free, not because I’m Ukrainian but because I’m innocent.”

On March 25, the Naples court dropped all charges and completely released Eugene Lavrenchuk.

References 

1982 births
Ukrainian male actors
Russian male actors
Ukrainian theatre directors
Russian theatre directors
Living people
Actors from Lviv
Recipients of the title of Merited Artist of Ukraine
Recipient of the Meritorious Activist of Culture badge